Anthony Charles Kaufmann (December 16, 1900 – June 4, 1982) was an American professional baseball player, coach and manager. He played in 260 Major League games, primarily as a pitcher, for the Chicago Cubs (1921–27), Philadelphia Phillies (1927), St. Louis Cardinals (1927–28, 1930–31 and 1935) and New York Giants (1929).

Kaufmann led the National League in hit batsmen (11) in 1923 and home runs allowed (21) in 1924.

In 11 seasons and 202 games pitched, he had a 64–62 record, with 123 starts, 71 complete games, nine shutouts, 12 saves,  innings pitched, 1,198 hits allowed, 587 runs allowed, 81 home runs allowed, 368 walks, 345 strikeouts, 39 hit batsmen, 15 wild pitches and a 4.18 earned run average. As a competent hitting pitcher, Kaufmann also played 18 games in the outfield during his late-career stints with the Phillies, Giants and Cardinals. In 414 Major League at bats, he collected 91 hits, with 19 doubles and nine home runs, for a batting average of .220.

After his active career, Kaufmann managed in the Cardinals' farm system (1938–42), and scouted (1943–46) and coached (1947–50) for the MLB Redbirds. He died in Elgin, Illinois, at the age of 81.

See also
 List of St. Louis Cardinals coaches

References

External links

1900 births
1982 deaths
Baseball players from Chicago
Chicago Cubs players
Decatur Commodores players
Houston Buffaloes players
Major League Baseball pitchers
New York Giants (NL) players
Philadelphia Phillies players
Rochester Red Wings managers
Rochester Red Wings players
St. Louis Cardinals coaches
St. Louis Cardinals players
St. Louis Cardinals scouts
Sportspeople from Chicago
Winnipeg Maroons (baseball) players